William Edwy Vine (1873–1949), commonly known as W. E. Vine, was an English Biblical scholar, theologian, and writer, most famous for Vine's Expository Dictionary of New Testament Words.

Life
Vine was born in the second quarter of 1873, in Blandford Forum, Dorset. His father ran the Mount Radford School, which moved to Exeter in 1875, and it was in this location that Vine was raised. He became a Christian at an early age and was baptised in the Plymouth Brethren assembly in Fore Street, Exeter. At 17, Vine became a teacher at his father's school, before moving to Aberystwyth to study at the University College of Wales. He later completed his education at the University of London, receiving a BA and MA in Ancient Classics in 1906.
Vine married Phoebe Baxendale in the 3rd quarter of 1899 in Lancashire, Phoebe's home county. In 1909, he accepted a job at the office of Echoes of Service, a missionary-support service and magazine based in Bath. In 1911, the service moved permanently to Widcombe Crescent, Bath. The 1911 census shows Vine as the Vice Principal of Mount Radford School in St Leonards, Exeter. Vine dedicated himself to his work with missionaries around the world and was firm in his doctrine and practice:

"In the mind of God the grand ultimate object of missionary activity is the planting of churches.. The Head of the church who gave His instructions to His Apostles.. .on record for us in the Scriptures, gave therein a body of truth and principles adapted to every age, generation and condition. The pattern is complete, and exhibits the divine wisdom in every part. Human tampering has only marred it in its working... It is incumbent upon all who profess the Christian faith to respect the plainly revealed intentions of the Head of the church, instead of burdening it with doctrines and regulations of human fabrication."

At this time, Vine was an Elder in the assembly at Manvers Hall, Bath, a position that he held for 40 years. He was diagnosed with heart disease in 1927, but lived until 1949.

Writing
Vine began his writing career in 1905, when he conducted a correspondence course, along with C.F. Hogg, for 1 Thessalonians and Galatians. He is best known for his work Vine's Expository Dictionary of New Testament Words, first published in four parts in 1940. This lexicon traces the words of the King James Version of the Holy Bible back to their Ancient koine Greek root words and to the meanings of the words for that day. Vine also wrote a number of commentaries and books on biblical subjects.

List of Complete Works
 An Expository Dictionary of New Testament Words: A Comprehensive Dictionary of the Original Greek Words with their Precise Meanings for English Readers (1940)
The Scriptures and How to Use Them (1910?)
The Divine Inspiration of the Bible (1923)
Isaiah: Prophecies, Promises, Warnings (1946)
The Leading Themes of the Gospel of John (1924)
John: His Record of Christ (1948)
The Epistle to the Romans: Doctrine, Precept, Practice (1948)
Commentary on 1 Corinthians
Commentary on Galatians
Commentary on Philippians
Commentary on 1 & 2 Thessalonians
Commentary on 1 & 2 Timothy
Commentary on Titus
Commentary on Hebrews
Commentary on James
Commentary on 1, 2, & 3 John
Christ's Eternal Sonship
The First and the Last
The Coming Priest-King
Christ the Firstborn
The Atonement
The Gospel of the Bible
B.C. and A.D.
The Gospel of the Glory
The Twelve Mysteries of Scripture
The Church and the Churches (nd)
Divine Headships in the Bible: or, Whence this Authority? (1924)
Baptism
The Ministry of Women
Leading in Prayer
The Mistaken Term "The Brethren"
The Origin and Rise of Ecclesiasticism and the Papal System
The Divine Plan of Missions
A Guide to Missionary Service
Approved of God
Service
Touching the Coming of the Lord
Witnesses to the Second Advent
The Church and the Tribulation
The Rapture and the Great Tribulation
The Roman Empire in the Light of Prophecy
The Four Women of the Apocalypse
The Evolution Theory in the Light of Genesis
Spiritism Unmasked
New Testament Greek Grammar: A Course of Self Help for the Layman

References

 Biography at PlymouthBrethren.org
 Biography at The Brethren Writers' Hall of Fame

External links
 

English theologians
British Plymouth Brethren
People from Blandford Forum
Alumni of Aberystwyth University
Alumni of the University of London
People educated at Mount Radford School
1873 births
1949 deaths